Poulette may refer to:

 HMS Poulette, two Royal Navy ships
 Michel Poulette, Canadian film and television director, writer and producer